Tip of My Tongue may refer to:

"Tip of My Tongue" (Tommy Quickly song) (1963)
"Tip of My Tongue" (Diesel song) (1992)
"Tip of My Tongue" (Lynsey de Paul song) (1973)
"Tip of My Tongue" (Kenny Chesney song) (2019)
"Tip of My Tongue", a song by Jagged Edge (2009)
"Tip of My Tongue", a song by Kelly Clarkson included on her album All I Ever Wanted (2009)
"Tip of My Tongue", a song by The Tubes included on their album Outside Inside (1983)
Tip of My Tongue, a 2000 short movie with Ben Miller

See also
Tip of the tongue
Anterior tongue
"Tippa My Tongue", a song by the Red Hot Chilli Peppers
"Right on the Tip of My Tongue", a 1971 single by Brenda & the Tabulations